Communist Working Group may refer to:

 Communist Working Group (Germany) (1921–1922)
 Communist Working Group (Thuringia) (1927)
 Communist Working Groups, in Sweden (1971–1972)